Chelpanovo is a rural locality (a village) in Terebayevskoye Rural Settlement, Nikolsky District, Vologda Oblast, Russia. The population was 57 as of 2002.

Geography 
Chelpanovo is located 31 km northwest of Nikolsk (the district's administrative centre) by road. Podolskaya is the nearest rural locality.

References 

Rural localities in Nikolsky District, Vologda Oblast